Facts of Life: The Soul of Bobby Womack is the fourth studio album American singer-songwriter Calvin Richardson. It was released by Shanachie Records on 	August 25, 2009 in the United States. A tribute album dedicated to singer Bobby Womack, Richardson was chosen to record the album to coincide with Womack's induction into the Rock and Roll Hall of Fame. It peaked at number 30 on the US Top R&B/Hip-Hop Albums chart, and garnered two nominations for Best R&B Performance by a Duo or Group with Vocals and Best Traditional R&B Vocal Performance at the 52nd Grammy Awards.

Critical reception

AllMusic editor Thom Jurek rated the album three and a half stars out of five and called it a "wildly ambitious but logical step. The dangers in doing a tribute to a legendary artist, especially Womack, one of soul music’s most storied and colorful legends as both a singer and songwriter, is a daunting task. But Richardson’s and Womack’s voices are very similar, though the latter’s is not as rough as the former’s and has more gospel in it, which works very well in adding to most of these songs."

Track listing

Personnel 
Performers and musicians

  Evan Bendit – saxophone
  Ron Benner – violin
  Michael Burton – saxophone
  Jorel "Jfly" Flynn – drums, percussion 
  Justin Gilbert – clavinet, organ
  Tres Gilbert – bass 
  Latonya G. Givens – backing vocalist
  Charles Gray – violin
  Tony Hightower – backing vocalist
  Artia E. Lockett – backing vocalist
  Tony Otero – engineer
  Derek Scott – guitar 
  John Raymond – trumpet
  Calvin Richardson – lead vocals
  Derek Scott – guitar 
  Twin Cities Horns – horns
  Justin Verhasselt – trombone

Technical

  Ron Benner  – mixing engineer
  Lance Conrad – recording enginneer
  Tres Gilbert – mixing engineer, producer
  Randall Grass – executive producer 
  Timothy Lee – executive producer 
  Paul Marino – recording enginneer
  Calvin Richardson – associate executive producer

Charts

Release history

References

2009 albums
Calvin Richardson albums
Tribute albums
Shanachie Records albums